The Screaming Jets are an Australian hard rock band formed in Newcastle, Australia, in 1989 by frontman Dave Gleeson (vocals), Paul Woseen (bass guitar), Grant Walmsley (guitar), Richard Lara (guitar), and Brad Heaney (drums). The band has three albums that peaked in the top five on the Australian ARIA Charts: All for One (1991), Tear of Thought (1992), and The Screaming Jets (1995). Their 1991 single "Better" reached No. 4 on the related singles chart. Walmsley left in 2007 and formed his own band. In 2013, bassist Paul Woseen released an acoustic solo album, Bombido.

Biography

1981–1990: Early years and The Scorching Adventures of the Screaming Jets

Dave Gleeson and Grant Walmsley met at St Francis Xavier's College, Hamilton, in 1981 and first performed together for a school dance at the Newcastle Town Hall. They formed the group Sudden Impact in 1985, which later became Aspect. Paul Woseen joined in 1988. Richard Lara, on guitar, and Brad Heaney joined shortly after. The band was renamed Screaming Jets in 1989. The group's first performance as The Screaming Jets was as The Love Bomb in a Newcastle pub in March 1989; they won the inaugural National Band Competition run by youth radio broadcaster Triple J in November of that year. The group relocated to Sydney in early 1990 and supported The Angels on a national tour. In May 1990, they signed with an independent label, rooArt. Their debut extended play (EP), The Scorching Adventures of the Screaming Jets, was issued in December 1990.

Through late 1990, The Screaming Jets became infamous for a series of raucous, sometimes violent, live shows. During shows to launch the debut EP, fights often broke out as the band's faithful Newcastle fans mixed with the new Sydney fans. A show at The Kardomah Cafe in Sydney's red-light district saw a string of casualties being ferried to the street outside with injuries including broken noses, a broken leg and numerous victims of heat exhaustion.

1991–1994: All for One, Living in England and Tear of Thought

In February 1991, The Screaming Jets released Better, which peaked at number 4 on the ARIA Charts. In April, their debut studio album All for One  was released. The album debuted at number 3 and peaked at number 2 on the ARIA Charts. The album showed influences from Van Halen, AC/DC and The Angels. It reached the Top 50 on the ARIA End of Year Albums Chart for 1991. "Stop the World" and "Shine On" both reached the top 40. The controversial track "F. R. C." ("Fat Rich Cunts") was a crowd favourite and related internationally. Gleeson would dedicate the song to Michael Gudinski or Russ Hinze at concerts. At times, "F. R. C." was performed by guest vocalists from Mortal Sin, The Choirboys or The Angels.

Following the album's release, the group relocated to the United Kingdom, where they based themselves for over two years. Their second EP, Living in England, was issued in June 1992 and included cover versions of Johnny Cash's "Folsom Prison Blues" and AC/DC's "Ain't No Fun (Waiting Round to Be a Millionaire)". The EP peaked in the top 20 in July.

In October 1992, The Screaming Jets released their second studio album, Tear of Thought, which debuted at number 20 and peaked at number 3 in 1994. A cover version of Boys Next Door's song "Shivers" was released in January 1993 and peaked into the Top 20. The group supported Ugly Kid Joe on their European tour in 1993, when Heaney was fired mid-tour. He was temporarily replaced by ex-Judas Priest drummer Dave Holland. Heaney was permanently replaced in the line-up by former BB Steal drummer Craig Rosevear in July 1993. In January 1994, after a US tour backing Def Leppard, Lara was replaced by Melbourne guitarist Jimi "The Human" Hocking (ex-Spectre 7). Both "Helping Hand" and "Tunnel" were Top 40 singles from Tear of Thought.

While the band remained only moderately successful overseas, in Australia they became one of the top-drawing live bands of the 1990s and they achieved the rare distinction of being embraced by both commercial and indie-music focused radio.

1995–1999: The Screaming Jets, World Gone Crazy and Hits and Pieces

In August 1995, The Screaming Jets released their third studio album, The Screaming Jets, which peaked at No. 5. It was co-produced by the band with Robbie Adams (U2). It was the first CD launched via live Webcast. The single "Friend of Mine", was released in October and reached the top 50. The group continued to tour and started recording their fourth album, World Gone Crazy which was released in August 1997 and peaked into the top 20. The album was produced by Steve James and rooArt had passed their contract to BMG. Hocking had left by June and was replaced on guitar by Ismet "Izzy" Osmanovic (ex-Judge Mercy). BMG released a compilation album, Hits and Pieces in November 1999. One new track, "I Need Your Love" was issued as a single and the limited edition included an eight-track bonus disc. In November 1999, the group participated in the extensive Last Great Rock’n’Roll Show of the Century Australian tour. the group started recording their next studio album, Scam, with former Skyhooks producer Ross Wilson. By early 2000 Rosevear left to be replaced by on drums by Col Hatchman

2000–2003: Scam, Live Forever and hiatus

In early 2000 Rosevear was replaced by on drums by Col Hatchman and the group recorded their next fifth studio album, Scam, with former Skyhooks producer Ross Wilson.  Scam was released in October 2000 on Grudge Records through Universal Music. They were selected to tour with Kiss and Alice Cooper in 2001. In June the band performed their last concert in Newcastle before an extended break. The live album of the show was released in December 2002 as Live Forever.

On 29 August 2000, The Screaming Jets were thrown off the inaugural Brisbane to Newcastle flight for the now defunct Impulse Airlines. The new Boeing 717-200 jet had taxied to the runway for the early morning flight when it was forced to return to the terminal after band members broke into a rendition of Puff The Magic Dragon. "We thought of everything to get the press and this is it," unrepentant lead vocalist Dave Gleeson said after the band was escorted from the plane by Australian Protective Services staff.

2004–2015: Heart of the Matter, Rock On and Do Ya and infrequent touring

In 2004 the group recommenced recording and touring. The group signed with Universal Music Australia and released Heart of the Matter in August 2004. In November 2004, Hatchman left the group, his last performance was recorded for the live Rock On album released in 2005 by Liberation Records. Hatchman was replaced by Mickl "The Slayer" Sayers, formerly of Sydney band Tripguage. In October 2006, four Screaming Jets songs were listed in the Triple M Essential 2006 Countdown: "Helping Hand" (voted 447 out of 2006), "Eve of Destruction" (voted 683 out of 2006), "Shivers" (voted 1588 out of 2006) and "My Badger Drinks" (voted 1596 out of 2006).

Early in 2007, founding member and guitarist Walmsley left the band and was replaced by Scotty Kingman, who engineered the band's next album. According to Gleeson, Walmsley left because his external commitments interfered with the band's schedules. Walmsley went on to form the indie roots band Agents of Peace. In October 2008, The Screaming Jets released their sixth studio album, Do Ya through StockXchange Music. In October 2009, Osmanovich left and Hocking returned to the line-up.

Live shows from The Screaming Jets were infrequent through 2010 and 2011, and the band played only one show in 2012, at the car festival Summernats. But the band returned for a short 'Best Of' tour in late 2013. In May, 2013, bassist and key songwriter Paul Woseen released his debut solo album "Bombido".

2016–present: Chrome, Gotcha Covered and 30th anniversary edition of All for One

In May 2016, the band released their seventh studio album, "Chrome", followed by a national tour with fellow Australian band Massive in support. The album met with critical and commercial success. In March 2017, it was announced The Screaming Jets will perform a national headline tour with Baby Animals in June and July 2017.

In July 2018, The Screaming Jets released Gotcha Covered their eighth studio album, a collection of 15 iconic Australian songs spanning from the mid 1960s to the 1990s.

In 2019, the band released a greatest hits album and national tour to celebrate 30 years as a band. 

In August 2021, the band will tour and release a re-recorded All for One, celebrating its 30th anniversary.

Band members

Current line-up
Dave Gleeson – lead vocals (1989–present)
Paul Woseen – bass guitar, backing vocals (1989–present)
Jimi "The Human" Hocking – guitar, backing vocals (1993–1997, 2009–present)
Scott Kingman – guitar (2007–present)
Cam McGlinchey – drums (2019–present)

Previous members
 Grant Walmsley – guitar, backing vocals (1989–2007)
 Brad Heaney – drums (1989–1993)
 Richard Lara – guitar (1989–1993)
 Craig Rosevear – drums (1993–1999)
 Dave Forbes – percussion (1993–1994)
 Ismet "Izzy" Osmanovic – guitar, backing vocals (1998–2009)
 Col Hatchman – drums (2001–2004)
 Mickl "The Slayer" Sayers – drums (2005–2017)
 Mark McLeod – drums (2017–2019)

Timeline

Discography

 All for One (1991)
 Tear of Thought (1992)
 The Screaming Jets (1995)
 World Gone Crazy (1997)
 Scam (2000)
 Do Ya (2008)
 Chrome (2016)
 Gotcha Covered (2018)

Awards and nominations

ARIA Music Awards
The ARIA Music Awards is an annual awards ceremony that recognises excellence, innovation, and achievement across all genres of Australian music. They commenced in 1987.

|
|-
| 1991
| "C'mon"
| ARIA Award for Best New Talent
| 
|
|-
| 1992
| "Better"
| ARIA Award for Highest Selling Single
| 
|
|-
| 1994
| "Shivers"
| Highest Selling Single
| 
|
|-
| 1998
| World Gone Crazy
| ARIA Award for Best Rock Album
| 
| 
|-

References

Sources

  Note: Archived [on-line] copy has limited functionality.

External links
 The Band's Own Facebook Page
 The Band's Home Page
 The Herald, 2013 : From Riffs to Rifts - Why Grant Walmsley left the Screaming Jets
 Saviours of Rock, 2006 interview with Dave Gleeson & Grant Walmsley.
 The Screaming Jets publicity photo by rooArt and Atlantic Records. Gleeson-Heaney-Lara-Walmsley-Woseen line-up.

Musical groups established in 1989
New South Wales musical groups
Newcastle, New South Wales
Pub rock musical groups
Australian hard rock musical groups
Grudge Records artists